Max Adler is an American lacrosse player. He played for DII Bentley University, before being drafted by the Denver Outlaws of the Major League Lacrosse. He now plays for the Chaos Lacrosse Club of the Premier Lacrosse League where he is a faceoff specialist. Indoors, he plays for the Buffalo Bandits of the National Lacrosse League as a defenseman.

In international play, he has represented Israel in the FIL World Lacrosse Championship.

Playing career

NCAA 
A native of Fort Lauderdale, Florida, Adler attended Northfield Mount Hermon School and initially intended to pursue a collegiate wrestling career, but injuries forced him to stop. He played lacrosse for the first time during his freshman season. Adler walked onto the lacrosse team at Bentley during his freshman season and was initially their fifth faceoff specialist, though over his four years, he worked his way into a starting role and finished his collegiate career as a two-time Division II All-American.

MLL 
He was drafted by the Denver Outlaws, winning a spot in the lineup after primary faceoff specialist Tommy Kelly suffered an injury. Adler would help lead the Outlaws to the 2018 Steinfeld Trophy, leading MLL with a 57.7% faceoff winning percentage. On August 10, 2019, against the Chesapeake Bayhawks, Adler won the final 23 faceoffs he took, his 95.83% set a new MLL record. 2019 MLL-All Star. 2020 MLL F/O Specialist of the Year.

PLL 
Adler declined an invitation to join the Premier Lacrosse League upon its founding in 2018 citing loyalty to the Outlaws and a desire to play for a city-based team. However, once MLL merged with PLL, Adler joined Chaos Lacrosse Club, winning the PLL Championship in his first season.

NLL 
Despite having no prior box experience, Adler joined the Buffalo Bandits during the 2022 season as they were one of the worst teams in the league on faceoffs and needed reinforcements. Adler was initially hesitant, however he joined the team due to many of his Chaos teammates also playing there. He scored his first NLL goal on a penalty shot against the Rochester Knighthawks.

Personal 
Adler works as a financial analyst for ESPN in addition to his lacrosse career. His brother, Mike, played lacrosse at Saint Joseph's University and Duke University..

Statistics

NCAA

MLL

PLL

External links 
Professional stats at statscrew.com

References 

Living people
American lacrosse players
Place of birth missing (living people)
Denver Outlaws players
Bentley Falcons men's lacrosse players
1994 births
Lacrosse defenders
Buffalo Bandits players
Israeli sportsmen
Sportspeople from Fort Lauderdale, Florida